Ernesto Colli (16 May 1940 – 19 November 1982) was an Italian film, television and stage actor.

Life and career 
Born in Biella, Colli graduated from liceo classico, then he started acting in some amateur dramatics and starred in two lost Super 8 films. After one year of university he decided to abandon his studies to enroll the Fersen drama school in Rome.

A real life friend of Vittorio Gassman, Colli often acted alongside him, especially on stage, and he made his film debut playing a small role in the Gassman's film The Devil in Love. He then appeared in a large number of movies and TV-series, even if usually in character roles.
He was a character actor who acted actively especially during the seventies.

Equipped with a particularly disturbing face, Ernesto Colli always recited customized roles for him, from the crazy to the delinquent and from the possessed to the weird man; probably the films where he had a most significant part was The Pleasure Shop on 7th Avenue and in Deadly Inheritance .

The last role he played was that of a porter of a stable in Rome, in the movie Pierino La Peste Alla Riscossa!, shot a few months before his death and in which he already appeared with the face and the physique excavated by disease.

Selected filmography 

 Il morbidone (1965) - Uomo del monsignore (uncredited)
 Pleasant Nights (1966) - Baccio
 The Devil in Love (1966)
 Deadly Inheritance (1968) - Janot
 Lucrezia (1968) - Valetto ambasciatore
 Spirits of the Dead (1968) - One of the Manetti brothers - director (segment "Toby Dammit") (uncredited)
 Faustina (1968) - Vespasiano - Lover of Faustina's mother
 Italiani! È severamente proibito servirsi della toilette durante le fermate (1969)
 The Conspiracy of Torture (1969) - Chief Guard (uncredited)
 Belle d'amore (1970) - Magnaccia (uncredited)
 Quella chiara notte d'ottobre (1970)
 La califfa (1970) - Un operaio
 La Poudre d'escampette (1971)
 Er Più – storia d'amore e di coltello (1971) - Gigi
 Per amore o per forza (1971)
 Maddalena (1971)
 Stanza 17-17 palazzo delle tasse, ufficio imposte (1971) - Parking Attendant
 Caliber 9 (1972) - Alfredo Bertolon
 Bronte: cronaca di un massacro che i libri di storia non hanno raccontato (1972)
 Hai sbagliato... dovevi uccidermi subito! (1972) - Dr. Torres
 Decameron nº 3 - Le più belle donne del Boccaccio (1972) - Renutio (segment "The Mummy")
 Winged Devils (1972) - Leutnant Ernesto del Prete
 The Infamous Column (1972) - Judge
 Rugantino (1973)
 Torso (1973) - Gianni Tomasso, the scarf vendor
 Non ho tempo (1973)
 Hospitals: The White Mafia (1973) - Patient on the bus
 Seven Hours of Violence (1973) - Tomassian
 Buona parte di Paolina (1973)
 Claretta and Ben (1974) - Remengo
 The Antichrist (1974) - Possessed Man
 Bello come un arcangelo (1974) - Cicillo, Sacristan
 Autopsy (1975) - Ivo
 The Suspect (1975) - Party Functionary in Paris
 Giubbe rosse (1975) - Photographer (uncredited)
 The Peaceful Age (1975) - Imbianchino
 Go Gorilla Go (1975) - The Watchman of Builder's Yard (uncredited)
 Illustrious Corpses (1976) - Detective on night duty
 Free Hand for a Tough Cop (1976) - Roschetto
 Meet Him and Die (1976) - Settecapelli
 Puttana galera! (1976)
 Io tigro, tu tigri, egli tigra (1978) - Conduttore del telegiornale (uncredited)
 Il Porno Shop Della Settima Strada (1979) - Bob
 Switch (1979) - Il Malato
 Pierino la Peste Alla Riscossa! (1982) - portiere di via Piccolomini
 Porca vacca (1982) - (final film role)

References

External links 
 

1940 births
1982 deaths
Italian male film actors
Italian male television actors
Italian male stage actors
People from Biella
20th-century Italian male actors